Eunicicolidae is a family of crustaceans belonging to the order Cyclopoida.

Genera:
 Eunicicola Kurz, 1877
 Spongicola Kim, 2005

References

Cyclopoida